Dinesh Chandra Gorai is an Indian and Bengali-speaking leader of the Church of North India. He was the first non-Anglican Bishop of Calcutta (1982–1999) and also Moderator of the CNI (1983–1986). He was appointed as the first new bishop of the CNI with its inauguration in 1970, to serve as Bishop of Barrackpore (1970–1982).
He was the first Bengali moderator of Church of North India (CNI).

Early life and education
He was born in Sarenga in the Bankura, West Bengal on 15 January 1934.  After completing his school education, he studied and graduated from the Bankura Christian College, then under the University of Calcutta.

Evaluation
He engaged himself in multifarious activities of the Church, and its maintenance and expansion at the grassroots.

References

Indian Anglicans
1934 births
Anglican bishops of Calcutta
Indian Christians
University of Calcutta alumni
Living people